The Team large hill/4 × 5 km competition at the FIS Nordic World Ski Championships 2023 was held on 1 March 2023.

Results

Ski jumping
The ski jumping part was held at 11:00.

Cross-country skiing
The cross-country skiing part was started at 15:00.

References

Team large hill/4 × 5 km